Hushe is the last village of the Ghangche District of Gilgit-Baltistan, Pakistan.  It is the highest village in the once extremely remote and impoverished Hushe Valley. Hushe men began working as cooks and porters for mountaineering expeditions in the 1960s. Hushe is no longer the poorest of villages, as its popularity as a trekking and climbing destination continues to grow. Climbers and trekkers come all the way from Baltoro Glacier, Concordia (Pakistan) and K2 via Gondogoro Pass, descend into Hushe village to reach Skardu District. Access to the Gasherbrums peaks is also possible going north up through Hushe Valley.

References 

Populated places in Ghanche District